The National Underwater and Marine Agency (NUMA) is a private non-profit organization in the United States founded in 1979. Originally it was a fictional US government organization in the novels of author Clive Cussler. Cussler later created and, until his death in 2020, led the actual organization which is dedicated to "preserving our maritime heritage through the discovery, archaeological survey and conservation of shipwreck artifacts.” Additionally "NUMA does not actively seek private funding. Most of the financial support for the projects comes from the royalties from Clive Cussler’s books."

History
Clive Cussler founded NUMA as a private non-profit organization in 1979, naming it after a fictional government agency in his series of Dirk Pitt novels. NUMA is involved in underwater archeology and survey.

NUMA expeditions 
NUMA's expeditions tend to focus on ships of American origin from the early 19th century to the early 20th century, especially on Union and Confederate ships of the American Civil War. NUMA has located or attempted to locate the following vessels and historical artifacts:

Trustees 
The NUMA Advisory Board of Trustees:

Clive Cussler, Chairman (deceased)
Dirk Cussler, President
Colonel Walter Schob
Dana Larson
Admiral William Thompson (deceased)
William Shea (deceased)
Michael Hogan
Harold Edgerton (deceased)
Clyde Smith
Don Walsh
Peter Throckmorton (deceased)
Tony Bell
Douglas Wheeler
Wayne Gronquist
Craig Dirgo
Ralph Wilbanks

The fictional NUMA 
In the Dirk Pitt series of adventure novels by Clive Cussler that debuted in 1973 with The Mediterranean Caper novel, NUMA is a government organization. The fictional NUMA is devoted to oceanic exploration and investigation, and is the agency employing the main characters in the series of books. Its headquarters is a 30-story building located on the east bank of the Potomac River, overlooking the Capitol building in Washington, D.C. The agency comprises over five thousand employees and scientists that often work around the clock on expeditions. It is often referred to as a marine version of NASA or the National Oceanic and Atmospheric Administration (NOAA), an American scientific agency focused on the conditions of the oceans and the atmosphere, and has research vessels that conduct many missions that are similar to the actual NUMA. 
 
The fictional NUMA is headed by the character Admiral James Sandecker, with Rudi Gunn as second in command, although Dirk Pitt is eventually asked to take over when Sandecker pursues the vice-presidency.

Housed inside this headquarters is one of the world's most advanced computer systems which contains almost every known piece of information, both current and ancient, about the sea.  The computer center takes up the entire 10th floor but is in an "open" setting with a raised circular platform that uses a hologram to display an artificial intelligence designed by Hiram Yeager, named Max, at its center.  There are no cubicles. Hiram Yeager designed, runs, and maintains the computer lab.

The Sea Hunters 
Cussler and NUMA have helped produce a television series on underwater exploration called The Sea Hunters, which chronicles the discovery and subsequent removal and conservation of the CSS H. L. Hunley in 1995.  The show also features a number of other shipwrecks in various international locations, and on occasion the failure to find anything at all, such as their attempts to find the Holland III prototype submarine.

The show features Cussler and James Delgado, who is also an author and executive director of the Vancouver Maritime Museum.  The show gives an in-depth explanation of the story of the shipwreck NUMA is exploring, including information about the ship's history and how it sank.

Two books titled The Sea Hunters were authored by Clive Cussler about NUMA's explorations.

References

External links
 Official website

Non-profit organizations based in Arizona
Fictional organizations
Dirk Pitt
Shipwrecks of the United States
Organizations established in 1979
1979 establishments in the United States